The 1st District of Columbia Cavalry was a Union Army cavalry regiment which fought in the American Civil War.

History
Four cavalry companies were formed from June to December 1863, under the command of Colonel Lafayette C. Baker for service in the defenses of Washington, D.C.; in November it was transferred to the Department of Virginia and North Carolina. Eight companies which had been raised in Augusta, Maine were attached to the regiment in early 1864. The regiment participated in the Siege of Petersburg during the remainder of 1864 and early 1865.

In August 1864, seven companies were transferred to the 1st Maine Cavalry, while the rest of the regiment was consolidated into two companies. After fighting in the Appomattox Campaign, the regiment served in garrison roles in Virginia until mustering out on October 26, 1865.

See also
List of District of Columbia Civil War regiments

Sources
 Civil War in the East

Units and formations of the Union Army from the District of Columbia
1863 establishments in Washington, D.C.
Military units and formations established in 1863
Military units and formations disestablished in 1865